The 1946 Boston Yanks season was their third in the National Football League. The team failed to improve on their previous season's output of 3–6–1, winning only two games. They failed to qualify for the playoffs for the third consecutive season. The season opener against the Giants was scheduled for Monday, September 30 at Braves Field. Due to heavy rain the game was rescheduled for and played on Tuesday October 1. This was the last NFL regular season game played on a Tuesday until the 2010 season.

Schedule

Standings

References

Dallas Texans seasons
Boston Yanks
Boston Yanks